Sun Shiyi (Vietnamese: Tôn Sĩ Nghị; 1720 – 1796), courtesy name Zhizhi, pseudonym Bushan, was an official of the Qing dynasty who served as the Viceroy of Liangguang and of Liangjiang during the reign of the Qianlong Emperor.

A native of Renhe (present-day Yuhang District, Zhejiang), as a youth, Sun was devoted to study and was said to have prevented drowsiness by knocking his head against a wall. Awarded a jinshi degree in the imperial examination in 1761, he was secretary to Fuheng during his Burmese expedition, and in 1770 had risen to be Treasurer of Guangxi, when he was cashiered for want of energy, and orders were given to confiscate his property. Struck with the fact that nothing was found to confiscate, the Qianlong Emperor re-employed him.

In 1788, as Viceroy of Liangguang, he invaded Annam and reinstalled the emperor Lê Chiêu Thống, who had fled in fear of the rebel Nguyễn Huệ. His forces were beaten by the Tây Sơn armies, and it was ultimately decided to leave Annam alone. He was sent to Sichuan to see the supplies of the army fighting in Tibet, into which country he advanced over terrible mountains as far as Chamdo. In 1792, on the conclusion of the war with Nepal, the suppression of the White Lotus Rebellion occupied his last days. His physical powers were marvellous, and he required hardly any sleep. He was a great collector of ancient inscriptions. He was ennobled as Duke Mouyong of the First Class.

References

Further reading

1720 births
1796 deaths
Qing dynasty politicians from Zhejiang
Politicians from Hangzhou
Political office-holders in Guangdong
Political office-holders in Jiangsu
Grand Councillors of the Qing dynasty
Grand Secretaries of the Qing dynasty
Assistant Grand Secretaries
Viceroys of Sichuan
Viceroys of Liangjiang
Viceroys of Liangguang